Gndevaz is a village in the Jermuk Municipality of the Vayots Dzor Province of Armenia. It is home to the 10th century Gndevank Monastery.

Gallery

References

External links 

 
 
 

Populated places in Vayots Dzor Province